Gerhard Zickenheiner (born 1 April 1964) is a German architect and politician of Alliance 90/The Greens who served as a member of the Bundestag from the state of Baden-Württemberg from 2019 to 2021.

Early life and education 
Zickenheiner obtained the general qualification for university entrance in Lörrach and then studied architecture in Karlsruhe and Stuttgart, graduating with a diploma (FH). He then studied architecture at the E.T.S.A.B Barcelona and conceptual design at Städelschule in Frankfurt and graduated as a master student with Enric Miralles. He also completed a master's degree in "Community, Urban and Regional Development" at the Hochschule für Soziale Arbeit in Lucerne.

Political career 
On 1 January 2019, Zickenheiner took over the Bundestag mandate from Gerhard Schick. He was a member of the Committee on European Affairs.

References

External links 

  
 Bundestag biography 

1964 births
Living people
Members of the Bundestag for Baden-Württemberg
Members of the Bundestag 2017–2021
Members of the Bundestag for Alliance 90/The Greens